Zygmunt Janiszewski (12 July 1888 – 3 January 1920) was a Polish mathematician.

Early life and education

He was born to mother Julia Szulc-Chojnicka and father, Czeslaw Janiszewski who was a graduate of the University of Warsaw and served as the director of the Société du Crédit Municipal in Warsaw.

Janiszewski left Poland to study mathematics in Zurich, Munich and Göttingen, where he was taught by some of the most prominent mathematicians of the time, such as Heinrich Burkhardt, David Hilbert, Hermann Minkowski and Ernst Zermelo. He then went to Paris and in 1911 received his doctorate in topology under the supervision of Henri Lebesgue. His thesis was titled Sur les continus irréductibles entre deux points (On the Irreducible Continuous Curves Between Two Points). In 1913, he published a seminal work in the field of topology of surface entitled On Cutting the Plane by Continua.

Career 
Janiszewski taught at the University of Lwów and was professor at the University of Warsaw. At the outbreak of World War I he was a soldier in the Polish Legions of Józef Piłsudski, and took part in operations around Volyn. Along with other officers, he refused to swear an oath of allegiance to the Austrian government. He subsequently left the Legions and went into hiding under an assumed identity, Zygmunt Wicherkiewicz, in Boiska, near Zwoleń. From Boiska he moved on to Ewin, near Włoszczowa, where he directed a shelter for homeless children.
 
In 1917, he published an article O potrzebach matematyki w Polsce in the Nauka Polska journal, thus initiating the Polish School of Mathematics. He also founded the journal Fundamenta Mathematicae. Janiszewski proposed the name of the journal in 1919, though the first issue was published in 1920, after his death.

Janiszewski devoted the family property that he had inherited from his father to charity and education. He also donated all the prize money that he received from mathematical awards and competitions to the education and development of young Polish students.

Death 
His life was cut short by the influenza pandemic of 1918–19, which took his life at Lwów on 3 January 1920 at the age of 31. He willed his body for medical research, and his cranium for craniological study, desiring to be "useful after his death".

Samuel Dickstein wrote a commemorative address after Janiszewski's death, honoring his humility, kindness and dedication to his work:

While Janiszewski best remembered for his many contributions to topological mathematics in the early 20th century, for the founding of Fundamenta Mathematicae, and for his enthusiasm for teaching young minds, his loyalty to his homeland during World War I perhaps gives the greatest insight into his psyche. The orphans' shelter that he set up during the war doubtlessly saved many lives, and is perhaps his greatest contribution to the world.

On 3 January 2020, the 100th anniversary of his death, a researcher from Australia travelled to Lviv and met with the director of Lychakiv Cemetery. Restoration of the grave was arranged, and the stone was restored. Janiszewski is buried in field 58, plot 82 of Lychakiv Cemetery.

See also
Janiszewski's theorem
Brouwer–Janiszewski–Knaster continuum

Notes

References
 et passim.

External links 
 
 

1888 births
1920 deaths
Warsaw School of Mathematics
People from Warsaw Governorate
Deaths from Spanish flu
Topologists